The American Negro Ballet Company was formed in 1934 under the auspices of Eugene Von Grona, a German immigrant. Originally composed of thirty African-American jazz dancers, the company focused on serious modern dance. Lavinia Williams and Al Bledger were lead dancers.

Debut
The poorly reviewed debut performance on November 21, 1937, was conducted by Dean Dixon. It was held at the Lafayette Theatre in Harlem, New York, US. Von Grona was the main choreographer for pieces by Igor Stravinsky, Duke Ellington and W. C. Handy, among others.

Failure and reformation
The company only lasted five months, until 1938. In 1939, the company was renamed "Von Grona's American Swing Ballet."

References 

1934 establishments in New York City
1938 disestablishments in New York (state)
African-American dance
Ballet companies in the United States
Dance companies in New York City
Performing groups established in 1934